Wild Animal Baby was a magazine for children published by the National Wildlife Federation. The magazine was targeted to children ages 2–4, and consisted of readings, pictures, and games designed to teach children about animals. The National Wildlife Federation also publishes Ranger Rick and Your Big Backyard, which are geared towards older children.

Wild Animal Baby was based in  Reston, Virginia and each issue featured a particular animal on the cover, and has multiple features that recur in each issue. "Out and About" follows the adventures of a variety of children from different cultures.  A "search" page appeared in each issue where children are directed to find animals from a list within the picture. The mascot "Sammy Skunk" appears on five pages throughout the magazine for children to try to find.

The magazine characters were also featured in a television show called Wild Animal Baby Explorers. The show introduces preschoolers to the world of animals and helps them develop important observation, problem-solving and listening skills. The series combine 3-D animated characters and wildlife footage to introduce fascinating animal facts and nurture young viewers’ inherent love for nature.

Wild Animal Baby, along with Big Backyard, was discontinued in December 2012. The two magazines merged to create a new magazine called Ranger Rick Jr.

References

External links

Children's magazines published in the United States
Animal and pet magazines
Defunct magazines published in the United States
Magazines established in 1990
Magazines disestablished in 2012
Magazines published in Virginia